Tahitian Woman with a Flower is an 1891 painting by Paul Gauguin, now in the Ny Carlsberg Glyptotek in Copenhagen.

References

Paintings by Paul Gauguin
1891 paintings
Paintings in the collection of the Ny Carlsberg Glyptotek
19th-century paintings in Denmark
Portraits of women
19th-century portraits